Ulf Kristiansen (born March 311, 1969) is a Norwegian painter and video-artist. He is currently living at Nesodden, Norway. While starting out as a figurative artist, Kristiansen is now mainly focusing on 3d animation and machinima.

Filmography
The Art Reception (2006) 11 min, machinima animation
The Doctrine of Hell (2006) 20 min, machinima animation
What I learned in 2006 (2007) 3 min, machinima animation
Mechanic mix (2007) music video (Selfish Cunt)
Tamin Sah Pade (2007) music video (Fiona Soe Paing)
She Burns (2008) music video (Ashley Reaks)
The Abyss (2008) 8 min, machinima animation, animation and "found footage"
My Little Ponygirl (2009), 3d animation, "found footage"
The Tiger and the Lamb (2009), 3d animation

External links
 Artist´s webpage
 Hd fest, Los Angeles
 Saatchi Gallery

Sources
 Hd fest, Los Angeles
 AFH Gallery, Los Angeles
 Dagsavisen
 Aftenposten
 Dagbladet

1969 births
Machinima
20th-century Norwegian painters
21st-century Norwegian painters
Norwegian male painters
Living people
Norwegian video artists
Norwegian contemporary artists
People from Nesodden
20th-century Norwegian male artists
21st-century Norwegian male artists